The Prom at the Palace was a British classical music concert held in London in 2002. The event was in commemoration of the Golden Jubliee of Queen Elizabeth II. It was held at Buckingham Palace Garden on 1 June 2002 forming part of the Golden Jubilee Weekend. It was the classical equivalent of the Party at the Palace, a pop/rock music event. Its name reflects the popular season of classical concerts held at the Royal Albert Hall, The Proms. The event was broadcast by the BBC and shown in more than 40 countries. It was directed by Nicholas Kenyon.

Event and venue
The concert was held in Buckingham Palace Garden as part of the Golden Jubilee. The event was touted as the greatest classical concert in Britain in many years in part due to the quality of performers on a single stage. Tickets were determined by a lottery and 3,000 telephones lines were set up to deal with the calls from applicants. Around two million applications were submitted to attend either the Party or the Prom at the Palace. Twelve thousand people attended the latter, including 125 guests in the royal box among which were eighteen members of the royal family.

This was the first time that the Queen had ever opened the garden up to the public and heralded similar celebrations, both during the Golden Jubilee Year of 2002 and in 2006 for her 80th Birthday celebrations, which included a party for fellow octogenarians and a Children's Prom at the Palace).

Performers
Orchestras at the Prom included HM Royal Marines Portsmouth, the BBC Symphony Orchestra and the BBC Symphony Chorus, the London Adventist Chorale. Compere Michael Parkinson asked the audience to stand as the Queen, wearing a lime green suit, entered the Royal Box with the Duke of Edinburgh and took her place with the British Royal Family. Individual performers included Dame Kiri Te Kanawa, Julian Bliss, Ashley Wass, Zenaida Yanowsky, Roberto Bolle, Angela Gheorghiu, Thomas Allen, Mstislav Rostropovich and Roberto Alagna.

Concert
The concert was the opening of the Golden Jubilee Weekend. In Buckingham Palace Garden, 12,000 guests each sat in their seats and ate a picnic dinner. They were provided with hampers packed with champagne, smoked salmon wrap, Jubilee chicken and strawberries and cream by the palace. The performances were done on a large stage constructed specially for the event. The performances were synchronized for ballet presentations inside of the Palace and broadcast to the crowds in the garden. The concert ended with "Pomp and Circumstance March No. 1", followed by the national anthem "God Save the Queen". At the end, the Queen stepped outside the palace to greet 40,000 people that were watching the event on widescreens in The Mall.

See also
 Party at the Palace
 Buckingham Palace Gardens
 Buckingham Palace

References

External links
amazon.com DVD listing for edited live recording of Prom at the Palace ISBN B000069B68

Golden Jubilee of Elizabeth II
Concerts in the United Kingdom
Classical music in London
British monarchy
2002 in British music
2002 in London
Buckingham Palace
June 2002 events in the United Kingdom